Pierre-Hugues Herbert and Nicolas Mahut were the defending champions, but lost in the semifinals to Feliciano López and Marc López.

Rohan Bopanna and Pablo Cuevas won the title, defeating López and López in the final, 6–3, 3–6, [10–4].

Seeds
All seeds received a bye into the second round.

Draw

Finals

Top half

Bottom half

References
 Main Draw

Doubles